Halloween Pussy Trap Kill! Kill! is a 2017 American horror film directed by Jared Cohn.

Plot
All-girl punk rock band "Kill, Pussy, Kill!" are captured by "The Mastermind" after performing at a Halloween gig. They awaken to discover that the only way to survive the night is to make their way through a series of trapped rooms. While The Mastermind watches on the band must try to survive rooms rigged with gas, acid and other lethal devices. In the end, they must kill each other to survive.

Cast
Sara Malakul Lane - Amber Stardust
Richard Grieco - Dale
Demetrius Stear - DJ Speed
Lauren Parkinson - Cat Sloane
Nicole Sterling - Natalia Midnight
Kelly Lynn Reiter - Bridgette Van Mars
Kelly McCart - Misty Megan Strange
Jed Rowen - The Mastermind
Dave Mustaine - The Mastermind (voice)
Paul Logan - Captain Lewis
 Margaret O'Brien - Bridgette's Grandmother

Reception
Critics negatively compared the film to the Saw franchise, while some praised the film's use of music.

References

External links

American horror films
Halloween horror films
American films about Halloween
2017 horror films
2010s English-language films
Films directed by Jared Cohn
2010s American films